The Martyrdom of St Erasmus can refer to:
 The Martyrdom of St Erasmus (Bouts)
 The Martyrdom of Saint Erasmus (Poussin)